Keri-Lynn Wilson (May 17, 1967) is a Canadian conductor of operatic and symphonic repertoire.

Childhood and education 
Wilson was born on May 17, 1967, in Milwaukee in the U.S. state of Wisconsin to an accomplished musical family. The richly artistic tradition into which she was born includes a grandfather who was an operatic baritone and a pianist grandmother. Her mother, Lynn Sharples, was a professor of English at the Université de Toulon, and her father, Carlisle Wilson, is a violinist and music educator.

As a child, she studied flute, piano and violin, was a member of the Winnipeg Youth Orchestra and performed as a flute soloist with the Winnipeg Symphony and Calgary Philharmonic. She also attended the Banff School of Music summer program. Later, she continued her studies in the United States at the Juilliard School, where she studied flute under Julius Baker. Mounting interest in conducting put her under the tutelage of Otto-Werner Mueller. During her student years at Juilliard, she first performed at Carnegie Hall's Weill Recital Hall in May 1989. She graduated from Juilliard with master's degrees in both flute and conducting. She made her debut with the National Arts Center Orchestra of Canada at the age of 23.

Career 
From 1994-1998, Wilson was the associate conductor of the Dallas Symphony Orchestra. After her time in Dallas, she entered the international circuit as a guest conductor for both opera and symphonic repertoire with extensive engagements throughout North and South America, Europe, Asia, the Middle East and Australia. Wilson became chief conductor of the Slovenian Philharmonic Orchestra in 2013, becoming the first female chief conductor in the orchestra's history. She held the post through the 2014–2015 season.

Her operatic work has brought her to the Bayerische Staatsoper, the Royal Opera House Covent Garden, the Vienna State Opera, Bolshoi Opera, Mariinsky Theater,  English National Opera, Maggio Musicale Fiorentino, Rome Opera, Palermo Opera, Parma Opera, Verona Arena, Macerata Festival, Puccini Festival, Los Angeles Opera, Washington Opera, Canadian Opera Company, Leipzig Opera, Czech National Opera, Nice Opera, Bilbao Opera, Royal Swedish Opera, Norwegian National Opera, Warsaw Opera, Bucharest National Opera, Israeli Opera, New National Theater of Tokyo, Opera Australia, and the Juilliard Opera, amongst others.

Her operatic repertoire includes: Eugene Onegin, Pique Dame, Boris Godunov, Lady Macbeth of the Mtsensk district, Iolanthe, Rusalka, Rigoletto, La Traviata, Simon Boccanegra, Nabucco, Don Carlo, Aida, Otello, Un Ballo in Maschera, Attila, Il Trovatore, Falstaff, Cosi fan tutte, Don Giovanni, Carmen, Faust, Romeo et Juliette, Manon Lescaut, Tosca, La Boheme, Turandot, Madama Butterfly, La Fanciulla del West, Gianni Schicci, La Rondine, Tannhäuser, Der Fliegende Holländer, Il Barbiere di Siviglia, Sigismondo, La Cenerentola, La Fille du Régiment, L'Elisir d'Amore, Lucia Di Lammermoor, Les Mamelles de Tirésias, L'Heure Espagnol, Hänsel und Gretel, Cavalleria Rusticana and Pagliacci, The Merry Widow, Der Kaiser Von Atlantis.

Her symphonic and concert work has brought her to Los Angeles, St. Louis, San Francisco, Cincinnati, Seattle, Ravinia Festival, Dallas, Houston, New York, Hannover, Aachen, Düsseldorf, Wiesbaden, Munich, Schleswig-Holstein Musik Festival, Paris, Vienna, Milan, Verona, Florence, Prague, Budapest, Moscow, Kiev, St. Petersburg, Madrid, Bilbao, Oviedo, Bratislava, Zagreb, Reykjavik, Jerusalem, Hong Kong, Beijing, Toronto, Montreal and Caracas, amongst others.

Her repertoire ranges from Classical to Contemporary music. Personal favorites include Shostakovich, Tchaikovsky, Prokofiev, Mahler, Bruckner, Beethoven, and Brahms.

In 2020, she was nominated for an Opus Klassik 2020 Award as "Conductor of Year," in recognition of her work on the recording of Rossini's Sigismondo.

In April 2022, she came up with the idea for the Ukrainian Freedom Orchestra, eager to find a way to help musicians and others in Ukraine. In the summer of 2022, she embarked on a European and North American tour with the orchestra, including an acclaimed performance at the BBC Proms: "Brahms's Symphony No 4 – conducted by Wilson without score and with serious guts – had raw swagger to burn".

To commence her 2022/23 season, Wilson made her Metropolitan Opera debut, conducting Shostakovich's Lady MacBeth of Mtsensk. Following on from this, she conducted concerts with the Orchestre national de Bordeaux Aquitaine and the Lithuanian National Symphony Orchestra. In November, she made her debut at Teatro Colon, conducting Tosca. In 2023 Wilson returned to Wiesbaden to conduct the Hessisches Staatstheater Orchester. She then conducted the Filarmonia Arturo Toscanini in Parma, Italy. In February 2023, on the eve of the first anniversary of the full-scale Russian invasion of Ukraine, Wilson led a special concert in Lviv, Ukraine commemorating the victims of the invasion. Entitled "The Concert of the Invincibles", Wilson led the orchestra and chorus of the Lviv Opera house in a performance of Verdi's Requiem and Ukrainian composer Victoria Poleva's "Bucha Lacrimosa". The concert was broadcast throughout Ukraine on the radio and streamed live.

Personal life 
In a feature article about her in the April 2004 American edition of Vogue magazine she says it was during her time at Juilliard that she came to feel her height was an asset rather than a liability, saying. "I loved being tall in New York. I came into my own." She speaks Russian, French, Italian and German, and enjoys reading poetry in her free time.

Wilson has been married to Peter Gelb, the General Manager of the Metropolitan Opera in New York City, since 2003.

Recordings 

 Danzón (1998) – Simón Bolívar Symphony Orchestra, Dorian Recordings
 Giuseppe Verdi's Rigoletto Story (2005) – DVD by Columbia TriStar Home Entertainment and Sony Pictures Home Entertainment
Dreamscape (2007) – Shauna Rolston's album
 Turandot (2007) – Puccini, TM Music
 La Traviata (2017) – NDR Klassik Open Air, Naxos
 Prokofjew, Walton, Vaughan Williams (2018) - Isabelle van Keulen, NDR Radiophilharmonie with Challenge Records
Sigismondo, (2019) – Rossini, live recording, BR Klassik
Romance (2020) – Valentina Nafornita's album

References

External links
  
 IMG Artists agency page on Keri-Lynn Wilson
 Keri Lynn Wilson at Canadian Encyclopedia

1967 births
Living people
Musicians from Winnipeg
Musicians from Milwaukee
Women conductors (music)
20th-century Canadian conductors (music)
20th-century Canadian women musicians
21st-century Canadian conductors (music)
21st-century Canadian women musicians